The Jose Andrada class is a ship class of twenty-two coastal patrol boats currently in service with the Philippine Navy.

History
In 1989, the Philippines placed an order of 4 fast patrol craft with Trinity-Equitable (formerly Halter-Marine Equitable) for USD9.4 million. The first of the four vessels, arrived on August 20, 1990, was named . The lead ship of the class was named after Jose Andrada, who was one of the original officers of the Offshore Patrol of the Philippine Commonwealth government. In April 1990, the Philippines ordered an additional ship and 3 more ships in August 1990. In March 1993, eleven more vessels were ordered. A total of 22 ships were acquired by the Philippines by 1999.

It was initially designated as Fast Patrol Craft, and was classified with a hull initial "DF", but later on was re-designated as a Patrol Gunboat, and was finally re-designated as "PG".

Technical Details

The class was built to US Coast Guard standards with aluminium hull and superstructure.

The ship class was originally designed to carry one bow Mk.3 40 mm gun, one 81 mm  mortar aft, and four 12.7 mm/50 caliber machine guns. Instead, the class are armed with one 25mm Bushmaster chain gun on Mk.38 Mod.0 mount on second and later batches (PG-379 to PG-395), four M2HB Browning 12.7 mm/50 caliber machine guns on Mk.26 mounts, with two positioned forward and two aft; and two M60 7.62 mm/30 caliber machine guns, both mounted amidships. The ship can carry 4,000 rounds of 12.7 mm and 2,000 rounds of 7.62 mm A large "Big Eyes" binocular is also carried on tripod mounts, one on the forecastle and one just abaft the mast.

The Mk.38 Mod.0 M242 Bushmaster 25mm chain gun was not installed on the first batch of boats (PG-370 to PG-378).

All are equipped with a Raytheon AN/SPS-64(V)11 surface search and navigation radar but with a smaller antenna as those used in bigger Philippine Navy ships. Like all other Philippine Navy ships, the entire class was installed with the Philippine Navy Vessel Tracking System (VTS) by the Naval Sea Systems Command.

A 4-meter rigid inflatable boat powered by a 40-hp outboard motor is stowed amidships.

Ships in Class

Gallery

Footnotes

References

Patrol vessels of the Philippine Navy
Patrol boat classes